Ælfstan (died 981) was a medieval Bishop of Ramsbury.

Ælfstan was consecrated in 970. He died on 12 February 981.

Citations

References

External links
 

Bishops of Ramsbury (ancient)
981 deaths
Year of birth unknown
10th-century English bishops